Töölö Church is a Lutheran church in the Taka-Töölö district of Helsinki, Finland. The building represents Nordic Classicism and was designed by Hilding Ekelund following an architectural competition. Completed in 1930, it originally served as a parish center and was dedicated as a church when Töölö parish was created in 1941.

The church main hall seats 400 people. There are also two parish meeting halls for 70 and 20 people. 

Töölö Church reopened in early 2016 after three and a half years of renovations.

Artwork
Töölö Church contains many pieces of art, including:
 Relief Heavenly Feast and gilded wood sculpture Resurrected Christ by Gunnar Finne
 Glass paintings by Gunnar Forsström
 Wall painting by Paavo Leinonen
 Reliefs of apostles Peter, Paul, Andrew, and Thomas by Carl Wilhelms
 Partial sketch on altar wall by Henry Ericsson – Ericsson was commissioned to paint the altar wall but was killed in a car accident before completing the work

See also
 Temppeliaukio Church – a popular church in the neighboring Etu-Töölö, also part of Töölö parish
 Kunsthalle Helsinki – an art exhibition venue also designed by Hilding Ekelund

References

Lutheran churches in Helsinki
Churches completed in 1930
Hilding Ekelund buildings
Töölö
20th-century churches in Finland
Neoclassical church buildings in Finland